Gullan is a surname. Notable people with the surname include:

 Campbell Gullan (1881–1939), Scottish actor
 Jamie Gullan (born 1999), Scottish footballer
 Martin Gullan (1876–1939), Australian rules footballer
 Stan Gullan (1926–1999), Scottish footballer

See also
 Gulla